Subhas Chandra Bose (1897–1945) was an Indian politician and Indian freedom fighter. This is a list of some books written by or about him.

Books written by Subhas Chandra Bose

Books on Subhas Chandra Bose

A–R

S

T

See also 
 Bibliography of Swami Vivekananda

References 

Subhas Chandra Bose
Bibliographies of people
Indian biographies